Fight to Win may refer to:

 Fight to Win (album), a 2001 album by Femi Kuti
 Fight to Win (film), a 1987 action film